A neck spasm is an involuntary contraction of the muscles in the neck region.

Causes of neck spasm
The possible causes of neck spasms include:
 Anxiety
 Muscle strain
 Tension
 Tetanus
 Spasmodic torticollis
 Stress
Surgery
 Viral infection
 Whiplash injury
 or other causes of spasm

References

Human head and neck